Michael Kolář (born 21 December 1992) is a Slovak Enduro mountain bike competitor.

For the 2014 season, Kolář joined UCI World Tour team, from the  team. He participated to the three wins of the World Championship by Peter Sagan for Slovakia in 2015, 2016 and 2017. He was named in the startlist for the 2017 Vuelta a España.

Major results

2011
 10th GP Betonexpressz 2000
2012
 2nd Challenge Ben Guerir, Challenge des phosphates
 3rd Time trial, National Road Championships
 5th Jūrmala Grand Prix
2013
 1st Central European Tour Košice–Miskolc
 1st Banja Luka–Beograd I
 1st Stage 2 Carpathia Couriers Path
 1st Stage 3 Tour de Serbie
 6th Trophée de l'Anniversaire, Challenge du Prince
 10th Road race, National Road Championships
2014
 5th Road race, National Road Championships
2015
 1st Stage 5 Okolo Slovenska
 2nd Grand Prix d'Isbergues
 7th Road race, National Road Championships
2016
 1st Stage 5 (TTT) Tour of Croatia
 3rd Road race, National Road Championships
2017
 6th Road race, National Road Championships
 10th Road race, UEC European Road Championships
2018
 3rd Road race, National Road Championships

Grand Tour general classification results timeline

References

External links

1992 births
Living people
Slovak male cyclists
European Games competitors for Slovakia
Cyclists at the 2015 European Games
Sportspeople from Prague